The 2006 Australian GT Championship was a CAMS sanctioned national motor racing title for drivers of closed, production based sports cars. It was open to vehicles approved by the FIA for International GT3 competition and to similar models as approved by CAMS. 
 The title, which was the tenth Australian GT Championship, was won by Greg Crick driving a Dodge Viper GTS ACR.

Teams and Drivers

Round schedule

The championship was contested over eight rounds.

Points system
Three championship points were awarded to the fastest qualifier for each round. For rounds composed of three races, points were awarded on a 38-32-28-25-23-21-19-18-17-16-15-14-13-12-11-10-9-8-7-6-5-4-3-2-1 to the first 25 finishers in each race. All other rounds attracted the same total number of points regardless of the number of races.

Championship results

Note: Total points scored and championship positions attained have been adjusted to override points summation errors in the published results retrieved from  www.gtchampionship.com.au

References

External links
 Natsoft Race Results, racing.natsoft.com.au
 www.gtchampionship.com.au, as archived at web.archive.org on 24 August 2006 

Australian GT Championship
Gt Championship Season, 2006